Lindsay Bowen (born October 25, 1983) is a former American professional women's basketball player. She played with the WNBA's New York Liberty in 2007, and had a European basketball career until 2010. A guard, she is 5'7" tall and weighs 145 pounds.

Career
Bowen grew up in Dansville, Michigan. Bowen previously played basketball for Michigan State University.  She graduated in 2006.

Bowen was one of the 11 finalists for the Nancy Lieberman Award.

In August 2012, Bowen joined the Texas Tech University Women's basketball staff as video coordinator.\

In August 2015, Bowen joined the Presbyterian College women's basketball staff as an assistant coach.

Bowen followed Presbyterian College coach Ronny Fisher to Campbell University as an assistant coach for the 2016-17 season.

Michigan State statistics
Source

References

1983 births
Living people
American women's basketball players
Basketball players from Michigan
Michigan State Spartans women's basketball players
New York Liberty players
People from Dansville, Michigan
American women's basketball coaches